James Paul Blaylock (born September 20, 1950) is an American fantasy author.  He is noted for a distinctive, humorous style, as well as being one of the pioneers of the steampunk genre of science fiction.  Blaylock has cited Jules Verne, H. G. Wells, Robert Louis Stevenson, Arthur Conan Doyle and Charles Dickens as his inspirations.

He was born in Long Beach, California; studied English at California State University, Fullerton, receiving an M.A. in 1974; and lives in Orange, California, teaching creative writing at Chapman University. He taught at the Orange County School of the arts until 2013. Many of his books are set in Orange County, California, and can more specifically be termed "fabulism"that is, fantastic things happen in our present-day world, rather than in high fantasy, where the setting is often some other world. His works have also been categorized as magic realism.

He and his friends Tim Powers and K. W. Jeter were mentored by Philip K. Dick. Along with Powers, Blaylock invented the poet William Ashbless. Blaylock and Powers have often collaborated with each other on writing stories, including "The Better Boy", "On Pirates", and "The William Ashbless Memorial Cookbook".

Blaylock previously served as director of the Creative Writing Conservatory at the Orange County High School of the Arts until 2013, where Powers has also been Writer in Residence.

He has been married to his wife, Viki Blaylock, for more than 40 years. They have two sons, John and Danny.

Awards
Blaylock's short story "Thirteen Phantasms" won the 1997 World Fantasy Award for best Short Fiction.  "Paper Dragons" won the award in 1986. Homunculus won the Philip K. Dick award in 1987.

Novels

The "Balumnia" Trilogy
Whimsical fantasy inspired, according to the author, by Wind in the Willows and The Hobbit.
 The Elfin Ship (1982)
 The Disappearing Dwarf (1983)
 The Stone Giant (1989)
 The Man in the Moon (2002)The original manuscript, initially rejected, from which The Elfin Ship was reworked, with commentary and an additional short story.

The "Narbondo" Series

Novels
Sharing the character of villain Ignacio Narbondo; The Digging Leviathan and its sequel Zeuglodon are contemporary fantasies set in 1960s California, while the remainder are steampunk novels set in Victorian England.
 The Digging Leviathan (1984)
 Homunculus (1986)
 Lord Kelvin's Machine (1992)  Expansion of the eponymous 1985 novelette.
 Zeuglodon (2012; sequel to The Digging Leviathan)
 The Aylesford Skull (2013; a Langdon St. Ives novel)
 Beneath London (2015; a Langdon St. Ives novel)

Short fiction and novellas
 "The Ape-Box Affair" (1978)
 "The Idol's Eye" (1984)
 "Lord Kelvin's Machine" (1985)  Expanded into a novel in 1992.
 "Two Views of a Cave Painting" (1987)
 "The Hole in Space" (2002)
 The Ebb Tide (2009; a Langdon St. Ives novella)
 The Affair of the Chalk Cliffs (2011; a Langdon St. Ives novella)
 The Adventure of the Ring of Stones (2014; a Langdon St. Ives novella)
 "The Here-and-Thereians" (2016)
 "Earthbound Things" (2016)
 River's Edge (2017; a Langdon St. Ives novella)
 The Gobblin’ Society (2020; a Langdon St. Ives novella)

Collections
All short fiction (except for the novelette Lord Kelvin's Machine) and two novels have appeared in two collections by Subterranean Press:
 The Adventures of Langdon St. Ives (2008)  Omnibus of Homunculus, Lord Kelvin's Machine, and the stories "The Ape-Box Affair", "The Idol's Eye", "Two Views of a Cave Painting", "The Hole in Space".
 The Further Adventures of Langdon St. Ives (2016)  Omnibus of The Ebb Tide, The Affair of the Chalk Cliffs, The Adventure of the Ring of Stones, and the new stories "The Here-and Thereians and "Earthbound Things".

The "Christian" Trilogy
Present-day fantasy using Christian elements, such as the Holy Grail and the silver coins paid to Judas.
 The Last Coin (1988)
 The Paper Grail (1991)
 All the Bells on Earth (1995)

The "Ghosts" Trilogy
Present-day Californian ghost stories.
 Night Relics (1994)
 Winter Tides (1997)
 The Rainy Season (1999)

Others
 The Complete Twelve Hours of the Night (1986)Joke pamphlet co-written by Tim Powers and published by Cheap Street Press.
 Land of Dreams (1987)
 The Magic Spectacles (1991)Young adult book.
 13 Phantasms (2000)Short story collection.
 On Pirates (2001)Short story collection with Tim Powers.
 The Devils in the Details (2003)Short story collection with Tim Powers.
 In for a Penny (2003)Short story collection.
 The Knights of the Cornerstone (2008) 
 The Shadow on the Doorstep (2009)Short story collection.
 Home Sweet Home and Postscript to Home Sweet Home (2012)Nonfiction essays included in A Comprehensive Dual Bibliography of James P. Blaylock & Tim Powers'' .

References

External links
James P. Blaylock - Official website
Website and discussion forum about Blaylock's writing

Interview with Blaylock regarding his novel 'The Aylesford Skull' and a reading of his story "The Pink of Fading Neon"

1950 births
Living people
20th-century American male writers
20th-century American novelists
21st-century American male writers
21st-century American novelists
American fantasy writers
American male novelists
California State University, Fullerton alumni
Chapman University faculty
Novelists from California
Steampunk writers
World Fantasy Award-winning writers
Writers from Long Beach, California